"Chicken Tendies" (stylised in all capitals) is a song by Australian singer Clinton Kane, released on 19 February 2021 as the lead single from his second EP, Maybe Someday It'll All Be OK.

Via a TikTok video, Kane said the song opens up the wounds of his strained relationship with his religious mother, and "about accepting things and relationships I can't change."

Background and release
On 20 October 2020, Kane first teased the song as a "lil idea" via his TikTok. Two weeks later followed it with another preview of the chorus in a stripped down format.

On 10 December 2020, Kane shared a snippet of the song with the caption "haven't leaked a song in forever so here we are". The song was officially released on 19 February 2021.

Charts

References

2020 songs
2021 singles
Clinton Kane songs
Columbia Records singles
Songs written by Clinton Kane
Sony Music singles